The Belgian railway line 130A is a railway line in Belgium connecting Charleroi with the French border near Erquelinnes. Completed in 1852, the line runs 29.3 km. It runs along the river Sambre, crossing it several times. Beyond Erquelinnes, a French railway line continues towards Jeumont, Saint-Quentin and Paris. Until the opening of the Paris–Brussels–Cologne high-speed lines, international passenger trains between Paris and Cologne traveled along line 130A.

Stations
The main interchange stations on line 130A are:

Charleroi-Sud: to Brussels, Ottignies, Couvin, Namur and Mons
Erquelinnes: to Jeumont

References

130A
Railway lines opened in 1852
3000 V DC railway electrification